Bass Residence (1970) is a home in Fort Worth, Texas classified as Modern architecture and designed by architect Paul Rudolph, a founder of the Sarasota School of Architecture, and he designed the home in that style. It was designed for Sid Bass and Anne Bass. The house features cantilevered horizontal shapes.

History 

The home is an extravagant white multilevel structure which can be classified as Modern architecture. The single-family home was designed by Paul Rudolph for Sid and Anne Bass in 1966. Sid Bass was a billionaire who made his fortune in the oil business. Sid Bass commissioned the home while he was a young man. The grounds included a swimming pool and a courtyard for vehicles. The entrance is found at the uppermost level of the home. The driveway extends out of the east portion of the home and leads to the entrance. Above the entrance there is the dramatic feature of a horizontal  cantilevered overhang. The architect, Paul Rudolph, thought that the Bass house was the best home he had designed.

Design
The home is built around a steel frame which is covered by glass and aluminum. The design draws from those of Frank Lloyd Wright and Ludwig Mies van der Rohe. It reflects a minimalist approach and straight lines. There are no curves in the home. The house features cantilevered horizontal shapes overlapping each other surrounding a courtyard. Inside there are four floors which have 12 level changes and there are 14 separate ceiling heights. It is said to resemble Frank Lloyd Wright's Fallingwater design. The building's design constructs an illusion of levitating horizontal planes: vertical planes are disguised by the cantilevered planes.

The landscape was designed by landscape architect Robert Zion. There were a total of 8 acres in the estate for which Zion was the original designer. From 1981 to 1982 another landscape architect Russell Page worked on a redesign of the estate's grounds. He stated "...the structure needs the tranquillity of an all green base." According to his plans, the grounds had few flowers, and one rose garden. The grounds also include a reflecting pool with a nude sculpture.

Plans

References

External links 

 The Paul Rudolph Heritage Foundation - a non-profit organization representing the Paul Rudolph estate, dedicated to communicating, preserving and extending Paul Rudolph's legacy with an online archive of over 12,000 images in addition to written and biographical materials.
 The Bass Residence Project Page from the Paul Rudolph Heritage Foundation archives
 Bass Residence: Paul Rudolph Foundation

Further reading 

1970 in Texas
Paul Rudolph buildings
Modernist architecture
Houses completed in 1970
Houses in Fort Worth, Texas